The 1995 U.S. Men's Clay Court Championships was an Association of Tennis Professionals tennis tournament held in Pinehurst, North Carolina in the United States. The event was part of the World Series of the 1995 ATP Tour. It was the 27th edition of the tournament and was held from May 8 through May 15, 1995. Thomas Enqvist won the singles title.

Finals

Singles

 Thomas Enqvist defeated  Javier Frana 6–3, 3–6, 6–3
 It was Enqvist's 3rd title of the year and the 5th of his career.

Doubles

 Todd Woodbridge /  Mark Woodforde defeated  Alex O'Brien /  Sandon Stolle 6–2, 6–4
 It was Woodbridge's 3rd title of the year and the 31st of his career. It was Woodforde's 3rd title of the year and the 35th of his career.

References

External links 
 ATP tournament profile

 
U.S. Men's Clay Court Championships